U.S.A. (stands for "Under Satan's Authority") is the only studio album by American horrorcore trio Flatlinerz. It was released on September 6, 1994 via Def Jam Recordings. Recording sessions took place at Chung King Studios, Next Level Studios, and Greene St. Recording in New York. Production was handled by Tempest, Rockwilder, Crush, DR Period and Kool Tee, with Kenny Lee and Russell Simmons serving as executive producers. It features guest appearances from Gravemen, Kool Tee, Mayhem, Omen, Rockwilder and the Headless Horsemen.

The album peaked at number 65 on the Top R&B/Hip-Hop Albums and number 24 on the Top Heatseekers and found controversy for its satanic themes. Also, the three music videos the group shot for the album, "Live Evil", "Satanic Verses" and "Rivaz of Red", were barely played because of things such as frontman Redrum rhyming while hanging from a noose and Gravedigger rhyming from a crucifix. The album only sold 36,000 copies and the group, along with the Headless Horsemen and Omen, was dropped from Def Jam. Three singles were released, but only "Live Evil" made it to the charts, making it to #35 on the Hot Rap Singles.

In 2009, Fangoria named it as an iconic horrorcore album.

Track listing

Sample credits
 Track 4 contains elements from "Crossover" by EPMD and "Party Groove (Instrumental)" by Showbiz and A.G.
 Track 5 samples the song "Seven Days, Seven Nights" by Sue Ann Carwell
 Track 7 contains a sample from "Step in the Arena" by Gang Starr
 Track 14 embodies portions of "Tonight's da Night" by Redman and "I'm Gonna Take Your Love" by Brother to Brother

Personnel
Jamel "Redrum" Simmons – main artist, vocals, sleeve notes
Darnell "Gravedigger" Cunningham – main artist, vocals, sleeve notes
Juan "Tempest" Clarke – main artist, vocals, producer, sleeve notes
Tadone "Kool Tee" Hill – featured artist, producer
Devon "Omen" Purkiss – featured artist
Gravemen – featured artist
Mayhem – featured artist
Dana "Rockwilder" Stinson – featured artist, producer
J. Leroy of the Headless Horsemen – featured artist
M. Gardner of the Headless Horsemen – featured artist
Nora T. – backing vocals
Anthony "Trace Bass" Brown – bass
Richard "Rich" Keller – bass, electric guitar, recording, mixing
Darryl "DR Period" Pittman – keyboards, percussion, programming, producer, arranger
Thomas "Crush" McQueen – producer
Divine Campbell – co-producer, arranger
Kenny Lee – executive producer
Russell Simmons – executive producer
Danny Clinch – photography
John Blackford – illustration
The Drawing Board – design

Charts

Singles

References

External links

1994 debut albums
Flatlinerz albums
Def Jam Recordings albums
Albums produced by Rockwilder
Obscenity controversies in music
Albums recorded at Chung King Studios
Albums recorded at Greene St. Recording